Oilton is a city in Creek County, Oklahoma, United States. The population was 1,013 at the 2010 census, a decline of 7.8 percent from the figure of 1,099 recorded in 2000.

History
Oilton began during the development of the Cushing-Drumright Oil Field. The first lots were sold in January and February 1915 by Walter Eaton and Ed Dunn. A post office was established May 5, 1915. The First State Bank opened and the newspaper, the Oilton Gusher, began publication in 1915.  In the same year, the Oil Belt Terminal Railway connected Oilton to Jennings, while the Oil Fields and Santa Fe Railway, an Atchison, Topeka and Santa Fe Railway subsidiary, bought the Oil Belt and additionally connected the town to Cushing and Drumright.  By 1920, Oilton had a population of 2,231. It became an incorporated city on April 18, 1921.

Geography
Oilton is located in northwestern Creek County at  (36.0850, -96.5866). It is on the south side of the Cimarron River near the head of the inundation limit of Keystone Lake.

Oklahoma State Highway 99 passes through the community, leading north  to Jennings and south  to Drumright.

Demographics

As of the census of 2000, there were 1,099 people, 447 households, and 291 families residing in the city. The population density was 1,690.2 people per square mile (652.8/km). There were 526 housing units at an average density of 809.0 per square mile (312.4/km). The racial makeup of the city was 86.72% White, 0.82% African American, 6.64% Native American, 0.73% from other races, and 5.10% from two or more races. Hispanic or Latino of any race were 2.73% of the population.

There were 447 households, out of which 33.6% had children under the age of 18 living with them, 51.2% were married couples living together, 10.3% had a female householder with no husband present, and 34.7% were non-families. 30.9% of all households were made up of individuals, and 16.3% had someone living alone who was 65 years of age or older. The average household size was 2.46 and the average family size was 3.11.

In the city, the population was spread out, with 29.1% under the age of 18, 9.2% from 18 to 24, 26.7% from 25 to 44, 20.0% from 45 to 64, and 15.0% who were 65 years of age or older. The median age was 34 years. For every 100 females, there were 89.2 males. For every 100 females age 18 and over, there were 87.3 males.

The median income for a household in the city was $23,274, and the median income for a family was $29,766. Males had a median income of $26,250 versus $19,219 for females. The per capita income for the city was $11,831. About 21.7% of families and 26.4% of the population were below the poverty line, including 35.7% of those under age 18 and 12.7% of those age 65 or over.

Economy
Oil production has steadily declined. The local economy is largely agricultural. About 91 percent of the employed Oilton residents commute to jobs in Bristow, Sapulpa and Sand Springs.

References

Cities in Oklahoma
Cities in Creek County, Oklahoma